Sunburst was an African band that was formed in 1970 by Zairean guitarist Hembi Flory Kongo. One of its members was Eric Allandale who used to be with The Foundations, and previously the New Orleans Knights. The band is a part of African music history.

Biographical
Their music was a combo of Afro-rock, Zamrock, and Kitoto. Following a radio session in 1973, the band gained national attention. A month after that in July  they won a band competition in Dar Es Salaam and grew more popular. They also recorded singles in Kenya. In 1976 they were working on an album. Their album was released in 1977 and around that time they had split up. Prior to the recording of their album, they had recorded a session for Tanzanian radio.

They were managed by Peter Bagshawe. Prior to becoming the manager for the band, Bagshawe originally from Yorkshire was a steam train enthusiast and living in Zambia at the time.

in 2016, the Ave Africa, The Complete Recordings 1973-1976 album was released. It was released on Strut Records.

Band members
 Hembi Flory Kongo
 Johnny “Rocks” Fernandes
 Bashir Idi Farhan 
 Kassim Magati
 James Mpungo
 Eric Allandale

Management and other
 Peter Bagshawe (Manager)

Releases

 

 Note: The limited edition version includes a bonus cassette, Strut STRUT128C

References

Links
 Interview with manager Peter Bagshawe

Tanzanian musical groups
Musical groups established in 1971